New York's 108th State Assembly district is one of the 150 districts in the New York State Assembly. It has been represented by John McDonald III since 2013.

Geography 
District 108 contains portions of Albany, Rensselaer and Saratoga counties. It also contains the eastern and central parts of the city of Albany and most of the city of Troy.

Recent election results

2022

2020

2018

2016

2014

2012

References

108
Albany County, New York
Rensselaer County, New York
Saratoga County, New York